Perumal or Tirumal is a Hindu deity. Perumal is worshipped mainly among Tamil Hindus in South India, Sri Lanka, and the Tamil diaspora, who consider Perumal to be a form of Vishnu.

Some of the earliest known mentions of Perumal, and the Tamil devotional poems ascribed to him, are found in Paripāṭal – the Sangam era poetic anthology. He is a popular Hindu deity particularly among Tamils in Tamil Nadu and the Tamil diaspora, and in Vaishnava temples. One of the richest and largest Hindu temples complexes dedicated to Perumal is the Venkateshvara temple in Tirupati, Andhra Pradesh. Other significant institutions include Srirangam's Ranganathaswamy temple, Kanchipuram's Varadaraja Perumal temple, and Thiruvananthapurum's Padmanabhaswamy Perumal temple.

Etymology 
Scholars believe that both Perumal and Tirumal ultimately trace their origin to a tribal confederacy known as the Mallas in ancient India, whose name was Dravidian for "people of the mountains". Both of these terms were originally titles conferred by the Mallas upon their great chiefs and kings. This title was eventually employed as an epithet for the deity Vishnu, until its original meaning was widely forgotten over the course of time. However, in some regions of Kerala, Perumal continued to be employed as its original usage as an honorific for a ruler.

Veneration 

The deity Perumal is identified with Mayon, literally meaning, "the dark-complexioned one", who is first referenced in the texts Purananuru and Pattupattu. Regarded to be the Tamil equivalent of Krishna, poetry from this period compares his dark skin to the ocean. Originally a folk deity, he was syncretised with Krishna and Vishnu, gaining popularity in the Sri Vaishnava tradition. His consort is stated to be Lakshmi, the goddess of fortune, beauty, and prosperity, appearing in even the earliest strata of Tamil poetry.

Mayon is indicated to be the deity associated with the mullai tiṇai (pastoral landscape) in the Tolkappiyam. He is regarded to be the only deity who enjoyed the status of Paramporul (achieving a oneness with Paramatma) during the Sangam age. He is also known as Māyavan, Māmiyon, Netiyōn, and Māl in Sangam literature. A reference to "Mukkol Pakavars" in Sangam literature indicates that only Vaishnava saints were holding Tridanda and were prominent during the period. Tirumal was glorified as "the supreme deity", whose divine lotus feet could burn all evil and grant moksha. During the post-Sangam period, his worship was further glorified by the poet-saints called the Alvars.

Festivals 

In the contemporary period, a major feature of the temple festivals of Perumal is the temple car procession. During this generally multiple-day event, an image of the processional deity (utsavar) and his consorts are adorned with lavish jewellery and garments. The image is accompanied by royal paraphernalia, such as elaborate umbrellas (chatra) and fly-whisks (chamara) flanking the deity on either side. The images are carried to and fro from the temple on a chariot along the streets in great pomp, halting at places to receive the obeisance of devotees. Adherents bearing sacred banners march at the head of the procession, followed by drummers and trumpeters to announce the presence of the deity. The car (vahanam) is accompanied by Vaishnava temple priests, beating cymbals and singing the praises of the deity. The vehicle is often in the form of Garuda, Hanuman, lions, swans, and horses on varying days of the festival. At the tail of the procession is a group of singers, reciting verses from sacred texts such as the Vedas and the Nalayira Divya Prabandham.

Hymns 
Among the most renowned verses that hail Perumal is the Tirupallantu, composed by Periyalvar, one of the twelve Alvars of the Sri Vaishnava tradition:

Temples
Of the 108 Divya Desams that are revered according to the Alvar saints, 106 are stated to exist on earth. Prominent among these Divya Desams are:
 Sri Navamukundan Temple in Thirunavaya, Kerala, India
 Sri Ranganathaswamy Temple, India
 Sri Ananthapadmanabhaswamy Temple in Thiruvananthapuram, Kerala, India
 Sri Varadaraja Perumal temple in Kanchipuram, Tamil Nadu, India
 Sri Thirupalkadal temple in Keezhperoor, Thiruvananthapuram, Kerala, India
 Sri Oppiliappan Perumal Temple near Kumbakonam, Tamil Nadu, India
 Sri Narashima Perumal Temple in Ahobilam, India
 Sri Ranganathaswamy Temple in Srirangam, India
 Sri Ranganathaswamy Temple  in Nellore, Andhra Pradesh, India 
 Thirumaliruncholai (Kallazhagar Temple) in Madurai, India
 Thiruvengadam (Sri Venkateswara Temple), in Tirupathi, India
 Thiru Narayanapuram (Selva Pillai Perumal Temple) in Melkote, India
 Aadhi Thiruvellarai (Pundarikatchan) in Thiruvellarai, India.

Prominent Perumal Temples in India
 Sri Sathya-Narayana Perumal Temple in T-Nagar, Chennai, India
 Sri Srinivasa Perumal Temple (TTD), in T-Nagar, Chennai, India
 Sri Vinavaraya Perumal Temple, in Ambattur, Chennai, India 
Sri Santhana Srinivasa Perumal Kovil, in Mogappair, Chennai, India 
Udumalai Tirupathi, Dhali Road, Udumalpet, India

Sri Lanka
 Perumal temple in Jaffna, Sri Lanka

Malaysia
 Sri Sunderaraja Perumal Temple Klang, Malaysia
 Sri Alarmelamanga Samedha Shri Srinivasa Perumal Temple, Batu Caves, Selangor, Malaysia
 Sri Renganathar Temple, Kawasan Institusi Bangi, Kajang, Selangor, Malaysia
 Sri Varatharajah Perumal Temple, Persiaran Kewajipan, SS13, Subang Jaya, Selangor, Malaysia
 Sri Perumal Temple, Simpang Morib, Selangor, Malaysia
 Sri Srinivasa Perumal Temple Devastanam, Pusat Bandar Puchong, Selangor, Malaysia
 Hari Krishna Perumal Temple, Port Klang, Selangor, Malaysia
 Sri Krishna Temple, Brickfields, Kuala Lumpur, Malaysia
 Shree Lakshmi Narayan Mandir, Jalan Kasipillay, Kuala Lumpur, Malaysia

United States
 Sri Venkateswara Perumal temple in the USA
 Sri Ranganatha temple in the USA

Singapore
Sri Srinivasa Perumal Temple, Singapore

See also
Vishnu
Ranganatha
Venkateswara

References

Regional Hindu gods
Tamil deities
Forms of Vishnu